Microsoft adCenter Analytics (codenamed Gatineau) was Microsoft's web analytics solution. In 2006, Microsoft acquired DeepMetrix Corporation and used the analytics technology to deliver adCenter Analytics. It competed with Google Analytics and was tied to Microsoft adCenter in the same way Google has tied Google Analytics to Google Adwords. This had led to some complaints by webmasters, due to a five dollar fee for sign up, compared to the lack of cost to use Google Analytics.

Features included: 
 Click and visitor tracking 
 Marketing campaign reporting 
 Conversion tracking 
 Demographic and geographic segmentation

In March 2009, Microsoft announced that adCenter Analytics would be discontinued. Existing accounts would be operational till the end of 2009.

See also
Web analytics

References

External links
Keyword Rank Checker

Web analytics